Arthur Ralph Tanner (25 December 1889 – 16 August 1966) was an English first-class cricketer active 1920–29 who played for Middlesex. He was born in Bromley; died in Edgware.

References

1889 births
1966 deaths
English cricketers
Middlesex cricketers
Free Foresters cricketers